Melrose is a settlement in Westmorland County, New Brunswick, Canada. It was founded by Irish settlers.  Melrose is on Route 16. Originally named Savagetown, the name was changed to Melrose, named after Melrose, Scottish Borders, in 1890 with the establishment of a post office.

History

Notable people

See also
List of communities in New Brunswick

References

Communities in Westmorland County, New Brunswick
Irish diaspora in Canada